Miu Fat Buddhist Monastery is a Buddhist monastery located in Lam Tei, Tuen Mun District, Hong Kong. Based on the principle of practising mercy, it has been actively organizing activities to promote Buddhism as well as education, culture, charity and welfare for years.

History
The Miu Fat Buddhist Monastery was first constructed in 1950. Over the following two decades came the construction of the 3-storey Ten Thousand Buddhas Hall at a cost of $60 million. It took six years to complete, with its consecration ceremony held in May 1980. A ceremony marking the completion of the 45-metre high and 7-storey main complex was held in mid-March 2010.

Features
The Mahavira Hall, located on the top storey of the Ten Thousand Buddhas Hall, has a floor height of about 20 metres. In the middle of the Hall, there are three gold-plated statues of the Buddha Sakyamuni, each of them is about 5-metre tall. Its interior walls are adorned with over 10 thousands of Buddha reliefs and a number of murals featuring a blend of Sino-Thai cultures. Higher up in the Hall are the Library of Buddhist Scriptures and the Attic of the Jade Buddha. On each side of the main entrance of the Hall is a 20-metre column carved with a dazzling lifelike giant gold-scaled dragon, making the building prominently imposing.

Adjoining the Ten Thousand Buddhas Hall, the 45-metre high and 7-storey main complex of Miu Fat Buddhist Monastery has been built since 1999. It comprises a Buddhist shrine, a community hall, a library and cultural/welfare facilities. The complex is meticulously designed with Lotus Shrine on the top floor resembling a gigantic crystal lotus blossom viewed from afar. A ceremony was held in mid-March 2010 to mark the completion of this electricity-saving and trendy Shrine. The lookout of the Shrine overlooks the landscape of Tuen Mun rural area.

The Monastery also has a kitchen serving vegetarian food for visitors.

Transportation
The monastery can be accessed via the LRT through Lam Tei stop. 3 bus routes also serve the monastery that being Routes 53, 63X and 68A.

External links

 The Ten Thousand Buddhas Hall can be explored through Google Maps at 
 
 Blog entries with pictures:  
 Miu Fat Buddhist Monastery, Hulu Culture
 Miu Fat Buddhist Monastery 
Madam Lau Kam Lung Secondary School Of Miu Fat Buddhist Monastery

Lam Tei
Buddhist monasteries in Hong Kong
Buddhist temples in Hong Kong